Hans Anders Södergren (born 17 May 1977 in Söderhamn, Hälsingland) is a Swedish cross-country skier who has competed since 1999. He earned a bronze medal in the 4 × 10 km relay at the 2006 Winter Olympics in Turin and also finished 5th in the 15 km + 15 km double pursuit event at those same Olympics. In the 2010 Winter Olympics in Vancouver he won a gold medal with the Swedish team in the 4 × 10 km relay.

Södergren won four medals at the FIS Nordic World Ski Championships with two silvers (15 km + 15 km double pursuit: 2009, 50 km: 2003) and two bronzes in the 4 × 10 km relay (2003, 2007). He has eight FIS Race victories and is a ten-time national champion at distances between 15 km and 50 km as of the 2005–06 season.

Södergren won the 50 km event at both the 2006 and the 2008 Holmenkollen ski festival, making him the only skier to have won an international 50 km elite race with individual start in free technique since 2004.

Södergren has a twin brother, Per, who was forced to abandon his cross-country skiing career following a back injury.

Cross-country skiing results
All results are sourced from the International Ski Federation (FIS).

Olympic Games
 2 medals – (1 gold, 1 bronze)

World Championships
 5 medals – (3 silver, 2 bronze)

World Cup

Season standings

Individual podiums
 3 victories – (3 ) 
 14 podiums – (14 )

Team podiums
 1 victory – (1 ) 
 6 podiums – (6 )

References

External links
 
  – click Vinnere for downloadable pdf file 
  
 
 

1977 births
Living people
People from Söderhamn Municipality
Cross-country skiers from Gävleborg County
Cross-country skiers at the 2006 Winter Olympics
Cross-country skiers at the 2010 Winter Olympics
Cross-country skiers at the 2014 Winter Olympics
Holmenkollen Ski Festival winners
Swedish male cross-country skiers
Olympic cross-country skiers of Sweden
Olympic bronze medalists for Sweden
Olympic gold medalists for Sweden
Swedish twins
Olympic medalists in cross-country skiing
Mid Sweden University alumni
Twin sportspeople
FIS Nordic World Ski Championships medalists in cross-country skiing
Medalists at the 2010 Winter Olympics
Medalists at the 2006 Winter Olympics
Stockviks SF skiers
Östersunds SK skiers
Hudiksvalls IF skiers